The 26th Japan Record Awards were held on December 31, 1984, and were broadcast live on TBS.

Award winners 
Japan Record Award:
Hiroshi Itsuki for "Nagaragawa Enka"
Best Vocalist:
Takashi Hosokawa
Best New Artist:
Yukiko Okada
Best Album:
Mariko Takahashi for "Triad"

External links
Official Website

Japan Record Awards
Japan Record Awards
Japan Record Awards
Japan Record Awards
1984